On 1 February 1995, English animal rights activist Jill Phipps was crushed to death under a lorry during a protest to stop the air export of live calves for veal near Coventry Airport.

Background of protests

In 1994, animal rights protesters in England had convinced the major ferries (P & O, Stena Sealink, and Brittany Ferries) to stop live animal exports. In January 1995, a group of thirty farmers established an organization (ITF) to acquire alternative transportation through sea and air ports. One such pathway was air exports via Coventry Airport. Protesters had successfully pressured Coventry, Plymouth and Dover officials to ban the exports, but all were ordered by the courts to permit them.

When exports resumed in early January 1995 via the port in Shoreham, Sussex, a crowd of 500–600 protesters "blocked the roads, damaged the lorries and were violent to the drivers and the police" which succeeded in stopping sea exports for a few days, until authorities added over 1,000 policemen to escort the convoys. Policing costs exceeded £6 million and 20,000 man-hours, and the Chief Constable of Sussex declared they would only support the ports two days a week and that they would prevent passage of lorries on the other days. These quantitative restrictions were challenged in court and it was "concluded that the unlawful activity of protesters and its effects on police resources provided no justification for totally prohibiting a lawful trade."

More court wranglings followed, but in the end the trade was ended in 1996 when most of the European Economic Community boycotted British beef due to an outbreak of mad cow disease. In 2006 this ban was lifted, but Coventry Airport's executive chairman pledged that he would refuse requests to fly live calves.

Jill Phipps

Jill Phipps (15 January 1964 – 1 February 1995) left school at the age of 16 and went to work for the Royal Mail. She had become interested in caring for animals when young, and joined her mother's campaigning against the fur trade from the age of 11. After herself becoming a vegetarian, Phipps persuaded the rest of her family to join her. Phipps joined the Eastern Animal Liberation League, and a local campaign Phipps and her mother took part in resulted in pressuring a local fur shop and fur farm to close down.

In 1986, together with her mother and sister, Phipps raided the Unilever laboratories in objection of their practice of vivisection, and "smashed computer equipment, causing thousands of pounds worth of damage". The group was caught and prosecuted: Phipps' mother was sentenced to six months imprisonment, her sister to eighteen months, but Phipps herself received a suspended sentence as she was pregnant.

After her son was born, Phipps spent less time protesting, attending occasional demonstrations and hunt sabotage meetings with her young son. The use of Coventry airport for export of veal calves horrified her, and in January 1995 she walked almost 100 miles from Coventry to Westminster to protest. On her 31st birthday she protested outside the home of the man who ran Phoenix Aviation, the firm that operated the exports from Coventry airport.

Fatal accident

On 1 February 1995, Phipps was one of 35 protesters at Coventry Airport in Baginton, protesting the export of live calves to Amsterdam for distribution across Europe. Ten protesters broke through police lines and were trying to bring the lorry to a halt by sitting in the road or chaining themselves to it when Phipps was crushed beneath the lorry's wheels; her fatal injuries included a broken spine.

The Crown Prosecution Service ruled there was  no evidence to bring any charges against the driver. Phipps' family blamed the police for her death because the police were working to keep the convoy of lorries moving. The inquest heard that the driver may have been distracted by a protester running into the road ahead of him, who was being removed by a policeman. A verdict of accidental death was returned.

Aftermath 
For many years, animal rights protests were held around the anniversary date of Phipps' death, and many have claimed Phipps was a martyr to the cause. Though Phipps had been quoted as saying "Yes, I think people could be hurt ... We are so determined to stop this trade, we will go that far," her father said "Jill was no martyr to the cause. She had a young son to live for. She did not want to die." Jill's Film, with footage of Phipps, the Coventry protests, the funeral, and interviews with Phipps' family was produced, and shown for the first time at the Jill's Day 2007 event in Coventry.

See also 
 Death of Regan Russell
 List of animal rights advocates
 Live export

Notes

References 

1995 in England
February 1995 events in the United Kingdom
20th century in Warwickshire
Animal rights protests
Deaths by person in England
Protest-related deaths
Road incident deaths in England